Klęcino is a non-operational PKP railway station in Klęcino (Pomeranian Voivodeship), Poland.

Lines crossing the station

References 
Klęcino article at Polish Stations Database, URL accessed at 21 March 2006

Railway stations in Pomeranian Voivodeship
Disused railway stations in Pomeranian Voivodeship
Słupsk County